Celticecis is a genus of hackberry gall midges in the family Cecidomyiidae.

Species
The following species are recognised in the genus Celticecis:

 Celticecis aciculata Gagné, 2013 - hackberry aciculate gall midge
 Celticecis acuminata Gagné, 2013
 Celticecis capsularis (Patton, 1897) - hackberry rosette gall midge
 Celticecis caucasicae Gagné, 2013 
 Celticecis celtiphyllia (Felt, 1908) - hackberry acorn gall midge
 Celticecis conica Gagné, 2013
 Celticecis connata Gagné, 2013 - hackberry aggregate gall midge
 Celticecis cornuata Gagné, 2013 - hackberry horn gall midge
 Celticecis cupiformis Gagné, 2013
 Celticecis expulsa Gagné, 2013
 Celticecis globosa Gagné, 2013 - hackberry globular leaf gall midge
 Celticecis japonica Yukawa & Tsuda, 1987
 Celticecis ovata Gagné, 2013 - hackberry tenpin gall midge
 Celticecis oviformis (Patton, 1897) - hackberry spherical stem gall midge
 Celticecis pilosa Gagné, 2013
 Celticecis pubescens (Patton, 1897) - hackberry pubescent gall midge
 Celticecis pyriformis Gagné, 2013 - hackberry pear-shaped gall midge
 Celticecis ramicola Gagné, 2013 
 Celticecis semenrumicis (Patton, 1897)
 Celticecis spiniformis (Patton, 1897) - hackberry thorn gall midge
 Celticecis subulata Gagné, 2013 - hackberry awl-shaped gall midge
 Celticecis supina Gagné, 2013
 Celticecis unguicula (Beutenmuller, 1907)
 Celticecis wellsi (Felt, 1916)

References

Further reading

 
 
 
 
 

Cecidomyiinae
Articles created by Qbugbot
Cecidomyiidae genera